Hasanbeyli is a town and district of Osmaniye Province in the Mediterranean region of Turkey. Near the village stands a badly damaged medieval watchtower that once guarded a strategic route through the Amanus Mountains from Cilicia Pedias to Gaziantep.

References

External links
 District governor's official website 
  Photographic survey and plan of the watchtower at Hasanbeyli 

Populated places in Osmaniye Province
Districts of Osmaniye Province
Towns in Turkey